The Deputy Chief Minister of Tamil Nadu is the deputy to the Chief Minister of Tamil Nadu, who is the head of the government of Tamil Nadu. The deputy chief minister is the Council of Ministers of Tamil Nadu's second-highest ranking member. A deputy chief minister also holds a cabinet portfolio in the state ministry. In the legislative assembly system of government, the chief minister is treated as the "first among equals" in the cabinet; the position of deputy chief minister is used to govern the state with the support of a single party member, to bring political stability and strength within a coalition government, or in times of state emergency when a proper chain of command is necessary. On multiple occasions, proposals have arisen to make the post permanent, but without result. The same goes for the post of deputy prime minister at the national level.

The office has since been only intermittently occupied, having been occupied for a little more than 5 years out of the 12 years since its inauguration. Since 2009, Tamil Nadu has had 2 deputy chief ministers, none of whom have served at least one full term. The first was former chief minister of Tamil Nadu M. Karunanidhi's third son, M. K. Stalin of the Dravida Munnetra Kazhagam, who was sworn in on 29 May 2009; he was also rural development and local administration minister in Karunanidhi's fifth ministry. The position was vacant until All India Anna Dravida Munnetra Kazhagam's O. Panneerselvam took over; he became the second deputy chief minister on 21 August 2017 and took on the role in addition to his finance ministership in Edappadi K. Palaniswami's government. He was the last person to serve as the deputy chief minister of Tamil Nadu until the post became vacant.

The current government does not have a deputy chief minister, and the post has been vacant since 7 May 2021.

List

Timeline

Statistics
List of deputy chief ministers by length of term

List by party

Parties by total duration (in days) of holding Deputy Chief Minister's Office

See also
History of Tamil Nadu
Elections in Tamil Nadu
List of governors of Tamil Nadu
Chief Secretariat of Tamil Nadu
Tamil Nadu Legislative Assembly
List of chief ministers of Tamil Nadu
List of current Indian deputy chief ministers
List of speakers of the Tamil Nadu Legislative Assembly
List of leaders of the house in the Tamil Nadu Legislative Assembly
List of leaders of the opposition in the Tamil Nadu Legislative Assembly

Notes

References

Deputy Chief Ministers of Tamil Nadu
Tamil Nadu